Ingar Sletten Kolloen (born 9 July 1951) is a Norwegian journalist, biographer, novelist and playwright. He has written biographies of Tor Jonsson, Knut Hamsun and Joralf Gjerstad. He wrote the play Jeg kunne gråte blod in 2004, and the novel Den fjerde engelen in 2007.

References

1951 births
Living people
Norwegian journalists
Norwegian biographers
Male biographers
21st-century Norwegian novelists
Norwegian dramatists and playwrights
Norwegian male novelists
Norwegian male dramatists and playwrights
21st-century Norwegian male writers